Jacqueline Schneider (born 12 August 1972) is a Swiss diver. She competed in the women's synchronized 3 metre springboard event at the 2000 Summer Olympics.

References

External links
 

1972 births
Living people
Swiss female divers
Olympic divers of Switzerland
Divers at the 2000 Summer Olympics
Place of birth missing (living people)